is a Japanese musician, composer, record producer, writer, and steelpan player based in Tokyo. In Japan during the 1980s and 1990s, he pioneered various music genres, including hip hop, dub, acid jazz, exotica, and electronic music. He is the first professional Japanese steelpan player, first Japanese hip hop producer, and the president of the Audio Science Laboratory record label, which he founded.

Biography
He was introduced to the sound of steelpan drums by a 1970s Van Dyke Parks album, and subsequently traveled to Trinidad and Tobago to learn how to play them. He later performed with Parks onstage during the late 1980s, playing steel pan. He was a member of Water Melon Group, led by Toshio Nakanishi of Plastics fame. He also mixed, arranged, and co-produced Seiko Ito's MESS/AGE (1989) album, which has been cited as one of the pioneering works in Japanese hip hop. 
Since the early 1990s, Tomita has pursued a music brand of cosmic kitsch, using synthesizers, steelpan drums, exotica and musique concrète.

One of his acclaimed works is his Space age pop concept album Doopee Time (1995), which followed members Suzi Kim and Caroline Novac (played by Yumiko Ohno of Buffalo Daughter) of the fictitious Japanese vocal duo "Doopees". It was recorded with drummer Chica Ogawa, and credited simply as Doopees. In it, he blended elements of Space Age exotica with steel drums, electronics, and tributes to Sun Ra, Chopin, the Beach Boys, and Phil Spector. A follow-up to the album, titled Doopee Time 2, was meant for release on July 28, 2006. According to Tomita, the album was worked on every day for about half a year, but had to be postponed indefinitely due to a two-month hospital stay amidst other circumstances.

Besides Doopees, he has also worked with a variety of music artists, including Grandmaster Flash, Boredoms, Kahimi Karie, Ippu-Do, Cymbals, Kyōko Koizumi, Tomoyuki Tanaka, Fantastic Plastic Machine, Hiroshi Fujiwara. Nigo, Towa Tei, Ryuichi Sakamoto, Cornelius, Toruman, Pardon Kimura, Yasuko Agawa, and Martin Denny.

Tomita is also known for his idiosyncratic stage performances, which have included demonstrations of an antique Serge modular synth, a "Biofeedback System", and a "Mind Disintegrator & Space Light Probe Phaser". As of 2013, he continues to perform live at music venues with Suzi Kim, Yumiko Ohno, and various others.

Discography

Studio albums

EPs

Live album

Publications
Forever Yann Music Meme 1 (2006)
Yann Tomita A.S.L. Space Agency (2010)
Forever Yann Music Meme 5 (2014)

See also 
 Music of Japan
 List of musical artists from Japan

References

External links

  
  
 
 

1952 births
Japanese composers
Japanese electronic musicians
Japanese experimental musicians
Japanese hip hop musicians
Japanese male composers
Japanese record producers
Living people
Musicians from Tokyo